Domingo Antonio de Andrade (Cee, 1639 – Santiago de Compostela, 1712 was a Galician baroque architect, a leading figure in the emergence of Galician Baroque architecture.

Works
In the Cathedral of Santiago de Compostela where, in 1671, he was designated as “Master builder” (architect):
Clock tower, called Berenguela  (1676-1680).
Royal Door to Quintana square, initiated by Jose de la Peña de Toro.
Finished the Tower of the Bells, initiated by Peña de Toro.
Finished the baldachin designed by Jose de Vega y Verdugo, Count of Alba Real and canon of the cathedral chapter. 
New sacristy, now capela do Pilar, finished by Fernando de Casas Novoa.

Other works in Santiago de Compostela:
Convent of Saint Dominic of Bonaval: The triple helical staircase, the tower and finished the cloister.
Several historic houses: “Casa das Pomas” (initiated by Diego de Romay), “Casa da Parra” in Quintana square, or the “Casas da Conga”.
Retables for the Convent of Saint Dominic of Bonaval and for the Convent of Saint Clare.

Sources

External links
  Andrade y la catedral de Santiago, por Mª Dolores Vila (in Spanish).

17th-century Spanish architects
18th-century Spanish architects
Spanish Baroque architects
1639 births
1712 deaths
Architects from Galicia (Spain)